Arthur William Luther (31 March 191925 January 2009) was an Anglican bishop in India from 1957 to 1973.

He was educated at Nagpur University and ordained in 1974. He was Chaplain to the Bishop of Nagpur then Headteacher of Bishop Cotton Boys' School before his appointment to the episcopate as Bishop of Nasik in 1957. Translated to Bombay in 1970, he retired three years later.

References

1919 births
Rashtrasant Tukadoji Maharaj Nagpur University alumni
Anglican bishops of Nasik
Anglican bishops of Bombay
2009 deaths